KCXY (95.3 FM, "Y95") is a radio station licensed to serve East Camden, Arkansas, United States. The station broadcasts a mainstream country format, serving the El Dorado-Camden-Magnolia area.

The station is currently owned by RadioWorks, Inc. and features programming from ABC Radio. Y95 is the area's official home for Arkansas Razorback sports, Camden-Fairview Cardinal sports, and other sporting events throughout the year.

References

External links
KCXY-FM Official Website

CXY
Country radio stations in the United States
Radio stations established in 1987
Ouachita County, Arkansas
1987 establishments in Arkansas